The 1990–91 All-Ireland Senior Club Hurling Championship was the 21st staging of the All-Ireland Senior Club Hurling Championship, the Gaelic Athletic Association's premier inter-county club hurling tournament. The championship began on 30 September 1990 and ended on 17 March 1991.

Ballyhale Shamrocks were the defending champions, however, they failed to qualify for the championship. Na Piarsaigh of Cork made their first appearance in the championship.

On 17 March 1991, Glenmore won the championship following a 1-13 to 0-12 defeat of Patrickswell in the All-Ireland final. This was the first All-Ireland title.

Results

Connacht Senior Club Hurling Championship

First round

Second round

Semi-final

Final

Leinster Senior Club Hurling Championship

First round

Quarter-finals

Semi-finals

Final

Munster Senior Club Hurling Championship

Quarter-finals

Semi-finals

Final

Ulster Senior Club Hurling Championship

Semi-finals

Final

All-Ireland Senior Club Hurling Championship

Quarter-final

Semi-finals

Final

References

1990 in hurling
1991 in hurling
All-Ireland Senior Club Hurling Championship